The 1% Club is a British game show that has aired on ITV since 9 April 2022 and is hosted by Lee Mack. The show is styled as an IQ test and the questions are not based on general knowledge, like many shows, but of "logic and common sense". The top prize achievable is £100,000.

Gameplay
Before the show, members of the public were asked the same list of questions, including ones featured in the show. Based on the answers, it displays statistically what percentage of the UK's population should get each question correct. In the studio, 100 contestants all face a series of questions beginning with easy ones (e.g. 90% of the country can answer) to difficult ones (e.g. what 5% of the country can answer).

At the start of the show, each contestant receives a £1,000 stake, and if they get any question incorrect, they are eliminated from the game and the £1,000 stake is transferred into the prize pot. At the 50% question, whoever is left in the game from that point on has the option to pass on one question. When passing a question, their £1,000 stake enters the prize pot and they must continue into the game. At the 30% question, anyone still in the game who has not played their pass has the option to take their £1,000 stake and leave the game, or continue on. If no-one makes it past the 5% question, the strongest player(s) still play for the prize pot.

Whoever gets furthest into the quiz (the 1% question) wins a guaranteed £10,000 unless they decide to play on to the final question, where what remains in the prize pot is played for. If there are multiple players in the final round, they play for an equal share of the prize pot. If a player has not played their pass, they win £1,000 regardless of if they answer the 1% question incorrectly. An incorrect answer to the 1% question means that the player leaves with nothing.

Transmissions

International versions
As of October 2022, BBC Studios has licensed the format in six territories. It has sold to France 2 in France, RTL4 in the Netherlands, Antena 3 in Spain, Sat.1 in Germany, and Seven Network in Australia. Israeli public broadcaster KAN 11 has commissioned a series of 15 x 60-minute episodes, to be hosted by comedian Shahar Hason and started broadcasting on October 24, 2022.

Games
In 2022, BBC Studios signed a licensing deal with John Adams Leisure to develop, manufacture and distribute a table-top board game based on the game show under the Ideal label for a Summer 2023 release.

References

External links
 
 

2022 British television series debuts
2020s British game shows
English-language television shows
ITV game shows